Mulberry Hill may refer to:

in Australia

 Mulberry Hill (Langwarrin South, Victoria), National Trust of Australia property in Langwarrin South, Victoria

in the United Kingdom
 Mulberry Hill Mine, Cornwall

in the United States
 Mulberry Hill (Edenton, North Carolina), listed on the NRHP in North Carolina
 Mulberry Hill (Lexington, Virginia), listed on the NRHP in Virginia
 Mulberry Hill (Randolph, Virginia), listed on the NRHP in Virginia
 Mulberry Hill, in Louisville, Kentucky, of which only the family cemetery remains, was the family home of William Clark, of the Lewis and Clark Expedition.

See also
Mulberry Grove (disambiguation)
Mulberry Plantation (disambiguation)